John Moffitt (born December 12, 1980) is an American long jumper. His breakthrough came in 2004 when he became NCAA indoor and outdoor champion, improved his personal best by 45 centimeters and won the silver medal in the 2004 Summer Olympics behind countryfellow Dwight Phillips. The next year he jumped only 7.96 m as a season's best.

Moffitt was a member of the Louisiana State University track and field team.

Achievements

Personal bests
Long jump - 8.47 m (2004)
Triple jump - 16.53 m (2003), 16.79 m (2004 indoor)
High jump - 2.15 m (2004 indoor)

References

USATF profile

1980 births
Living people
American male long jumpers
Athletes (track and field) at the 2004 Summer Olympics
LSU Tigers track and field athletes
Medalists at the 2004 Summer Olympics
Olympic silver medalists for the United States in track and field